The following are the records of Thailand in Olympic weightlifting. Records are maintained in each weight class for the snatch lift, clean and jerk lift, and the total for both lifts by the Thai Amateur Weightlifting Association (TAWA).

Current records

Men

Women

Historical records

Men (1998–2018)

Women (1998–2018)

References

External links

Records
Thailand
Weightlifting
weightlifting